Chhatarpur Assembly constituency is one of the 230 Vidhan Sabha (Legislative Assembly) constituencies of Madhya Pradesh state in central India. This constituency came into existence in 1951, as one of the 48 Vidhan Sabha constituencies of the erstwhile Vindhya Pradesh state.

Overview
Chhatarpur (constituency number 51) is one of the 6 Vidhan Sabha constituencies located in Chhatarpur district. This constituency covers the Chhatarpur municipality and part of Chhatarpur  tehsil of the district.

Chhatarpur is part of Tikamgarh Lok Sabha constituency along with seven other Vidhan Sabha segments, namely, Maharajpur and Bijawar in this district and Jatara, Prithvipur, Niwari, Tikamgarh and Khargapur in Tikamgarh district.

Members of Legislative Assembly
As from a constituency of Vindhya Pradesh:
 1951: Govinda, Indian National Congress / Panna Lal, Indian National Congress 
As from a constituency of Madhya Pradesh:
 1957: Govind Das, Indian National Congress / Dasrath, Indian National Congress
 1962: Ram Swaroop, Bharatiya Jana Sangh
 1967: Mahendra Kumar, Indian National Congress
 1972: Mahendra Kumar, Indian National Congress
 1977: Jagadamba Prasad Nigam, Janata Party
 1980: Shankar Pratap Singh Bundela, Indian National Congress
 1985: Jagadamba Prasad Nigam, Janata Party
 1990: Jagadamba Prasad Nigam, Janata Dal
 1993: Shankar Pratap Singh Bundela, Indian National Congress
 1998: Umesh Shukla, Bharatiya Janata Party
 2003: Vikram Singh, Samajwadi Party
 2008: Lalita Yadav, Bharatiya Janata Party
 2013: Lalita Yadav, Bharatiya Janata Party

See also
 Chhatarpur

References

Chhatarpur district
Assembly constituencies of Madhya Pradesh